Kyegegwa is a town in the Western Region of Uganda. It is the main municipal, administrative, and commercial center of Kyegegwa District.

Location
Kyegegwa is located on the Mubende–Kyegegwa–Kyenjojo–Fort Portal Road, the main highway between Mubende and Fort Portal.

Th geographical coordinates of he town are 0°28'49.0"N, 31°03'17.0"E (Latitude:0.480278; Longitude:31.054722).

Population
The national census of September 2002, enumerated 6,747 inhabitants in Kyegegwa Town. In 2014, the national population census put the population at 18,729.

In 2015, the Uganda Bureau of Statistics (UBOS) estimated the population of the town at 20,000 people. In 2020, the statistics agency estimated the mid-year population of Kyegegwa Town Council at 29,400 people. Of these, 14,700 (50 percent) were females and 14,700 (50 percent) were males. UBOS calculated that the population of the town increased at an average annual rate of 8 percent, between 2015 and 2020.

Points of interest
The following points of interest lie within the town, or near its borders: (a) the headquarters of Kyegegwa District Administration (b) the offices of Kyegegwa Town Council and (c)  Kyegegwa Central Market.

The Mubende–Kyegegwa–Kyenjojo–Fort Portal Road passes through the middle of town in a general east to west direction.

A mobile banking unit of PostBank Uganda serves the town once a week.

See also
Toro Kingdom
List of cities and towns in Uganda

References

External links
 Govt creates 190 town councils As of 27 February 2018.

Populated places in Western Region, Uganda
Kyegegwa District
Toro sub-region